The following is a list of islands of Norway by area.

Islands close to the mainland of Norway

For an exhaustive list ordered by name, see list of islands of Norway.

Islands distant from the mainland of Norway

See also
 List of islands of Norway (islands of Norway, sorted by name)
 List of European islands by area
 List of islands by area
 List of islands by highest point

References

 Toppomania - ״ytopper i Norge
 Mountains on Svalbard

Islands
Norway

Norway